Loïc J. D. Wacquant (born 1960) is a sociologist and social anthropologist, specializing in urban sociology, urban poverty, racial inequality, the body, social theory and ethnography.

Wacquant is a Professor of Sociology and Research Associate at the Earl Warren Legal Institute, University of California, Berkeley, where he is also affiliated with the Program in Medical Anthropology and the Center for Urban Ethnography, and Researcher at the 'Centre de sociologie européenne' in Paris. He has been a member of the Harvard Society of Fellows, a MacArthur Prize Fellow, and has won numerous grants including the Fletcher Foundation Fellowship and the Lewis Coser Award of the American Sociological Association.

Career and education

Wacquant was born and grew up in Montpellier in southern France, and he received his training in economics and sociology in France and the United States. He was a student and close collaborator of Pierre Bourdieu. He also worked closely with William Julius Wilson at the University of Chicago, where he received his PhD in sociology in 1994. Wacquant has published more than a hundred articles in journals of sociology, anthropology, urban studies, social theory and philosophy. He is also co-founder and editor of the interdisciplinary journal Ethnography as well as a collaborator of Le Monde Diplomatique. His primary research has been conducted in the ghettos of South Chicago, in the banlieues of Paris, and in jails of the United States and Brazil.

Research 

Wacquant's work explores and links together diverse areas of research on the human body, urban inequality, ghettoization, and the development of punishment as an institution aimed at poor and stigmatized populations. His interest in these topics stems from his experience in the black ghetto as a graduate student at the University of Chicago in the mid-1980s. Commenting on this experience in The New York Times in 2003, he said "I had never seen such scenes of desolation. I remember thinking: It's like Beirut. Or Dresden after the war. It was really a shock." His intellectual trajectory and interests are dissected in the article "The Body, the Ghetto, and the Penal State" (2008)

In his work, "Deadly symbiosis: when ghetto and prison meet and mesh" in Punishment and Society 3(1) (pp 95–134),  he offers a "middle-range" theory, relevant mainly to American racism against blacks in contemporary society. According to Wacquant, African-Americans now live "in the first prison society of history" (p. 121). The 'hyperghetto' constitutes the fourth stage in the development of 'peculiar institutions', following (sequentially) slavery, Jim Crow, and the early ghettos. According to him, the ghetto and the prison are for all practical purposes indistinguishable, reinforcing each other to ensure the exclusion of African-Americans from general society, with governmental encouragement. As Wacquant vividly characterizes it, the prison should be viewed as a "judicial ghetto" and the ghetto as an "extrajudicial prison". Taken together, these constitute part of a "carceral continuum".  To understand this concept, Wacquant argues for a single analytical frame unifying expansive "prisonfare" and attenuating workfare, resulting in a deepening marginalisation and social and political subordination of stigmatized and defamed "surplus" populations. Inspired by Bourdieu, Wacquant analyzes the structural constraints and consequences, and, like Bourdieu, endeavours to provide a more nuanced analysis than, for example, a reductionist Marxian economic analysis (cf. Rusche and Kirchheimer's Punishment and Social Structure, referenced by Wacquant in his Punishing the Poor (2009)).

The ghetto and the prison are now locked in a whirlpool, when it is no longer clear which is the egg and which is the chicken: the two look the same and have the same function (p. 115). The life in the ghetto almost necessarily leads to more criminal behavior, yet Wacquant presents statistics that show that the distribution of crime between black and white has not changed. Instead he shows that a black, young, man is now "equated with 'probable cause' justifying the arrest" (p. 117). And in the prisons, a black culture is being reinforced by "professional" inmates, a culture which later affects the street.

In his book Body and Soul: Notebooks of an Apprentice Boxer, Wacquant denounces popular mainstream conceptions of the underclass and argues that the boxing gym is one of the many institutions that is contained within, and opposed to, the ghetto. He also explores, through an account of his own experiences as an apprentice boxer in a black ghetto of Chicago, the elaborate process by which the "body capital" of these athletes is formed and managed, and in doing so, building upon the work of his mentor Pierre Bourdieu, he argues for the development of a 'carnal sociology'.

Publications 
 Bourdieu, Pierre, and Wacquant, Loïc (1992). An Invitation to Reflexive Sociology. Chicago: The University of Chicago Press.
 Wacquant, Loïc (1999). Penal 'common sense' comes to Europe – US exports zero tolerance April 1999 Le Monde Diplomatique. (original french version, ita version)
 Wacquant, Loïc (November 1999). Les Prisons de la misere. Paris: Editions Raisons d'agir. 
 Wacquant, Loïc (2001). 'Deadly symbiosis: When ghetto and prison meet and mesh'. Punishment & Society, 3(1): 95–133.
 Wacquant, Loïc (2004). Body and Soul: Ethnographic Notebooks of An Apprentice-Boxer. New York: Oxford University Press. 
 Wacquant, Loïc (2005). Pierre Bourdieu and Democratic Politics. Cambridge: Polity Press. 
 Wacquant, Loïc (2008). Urban Outcasts: A Comparative Sociology of Advanced Marginality.  Cambridge: Polity Press. 
 Wacquant, Loïc (2009).Punishing the Poor: The Neoliberal Government of Social Insecurity.  Durham: Duke University Press. 
 Wacquant, Loïc (2009). Prisons of Poverty (expanded edition). Minneapolis: University of Minnesota Press. 
 Wacquant, Loïc (2009). Deadly Symbiosis: Race and the Rise of Neoliberal Penality. Cambridge: Polity Press. 
 
 Wacquant, Loïc (2022). Body and Soul: Notebooks of an Apprentice Boxer. Expanded anniversary edition. New York: Oxford University Press. 
 Wacquant, Loïc (2022). The Invention of the "Underclass": A Study in the Politics of Knowledge. Cambridge: Polity Press. 
 Wacquant, Loïc (2022). Voyage au pays des boxeurs. Paris: Dominique Carré et La Découverte.
 Wacquant, Loïc (2023). Bourdieu in the City: Challenging Urban Theory. Cambridge: Polity Press.
 Wacquant, Loïc (2023). Misère de l’ethnographie de la misère. Paris: Raisons d’agir Éditions.

References

External links 
Wacquant's personal web page
Wacquant's page at Berkeley
 Loïc Wacquant on homme-moderne.org
 Wacquant's interview with Susana Durão in Labyrinthe, 31 (2008); in English as "The Body, the Ghetto and the Penal State," in Qualitative Sociology, 32 (March 2009)
 A boom in private penitentiaries. Loïc Wacquant. Le Monde diplomatique, July 17, 1998. 
 Bringing the Penal State Back In Speaker: Professor Loïc Wacquant, The London School of Economics and Political Science, October 6, 2009. (video)
 Loïc Wacquant, I reietti della città. Ghetto, periferia, stato, a cura di Sonia Paone, Agostino Petrillo, Edizioni ETS, Pisa 2016

Living people
MacArthur Fellows
University of California, Berkeley faculty
French sociologists
Social anthropologists
Harvard Fellows
Urban theorists
1960 births
Writers from Montpellier
Academic staff of the School for Advanced Studies in the Social Sciences
Urban sociologists
University of Chicago alumni
French emigrants to the United States